St. Thomas High School or Saint Thomas High School may refer to:

St. Thomas High School (Houston, Texas)
St. Thomas High School (Quebec)
St. Thomas High School (Braddock, Pennsylvania)
St. Thomas' High School, Jhelum
St. Thomas High School, Honnavar

See also
Saint Thomas Academy, Mendota Heights, Minnesota
St. Thomas Aquinas High School (disambiguation)
St. Thomas More High School
 Thomas High School (disambiguation)